The Bacia dos Frades Environmental Protection Area is an environmental protection area in the state of Rio de Janeiro, Brazil.

Location

The Bacia dos Frades Environmental Protection Area (APA) is in the municipality of Teresópolis, Rio de Janeiro.

History

The Bacia dos Frades Environmental Protection Area was created by state law 1.755 of 27 November 1990.
The APA was included in the Central Rio de Janeiro Atlantic Forest Mosaic, created in 2006.
On 31 October 2013 state law 6.573 extinguished the Paraíso Ecological Station and the Floresta do Jacarandá Environmental Protection Area, and modified the Bacia dos Frades Environmental Protection Area and the Três Picos State Park.

Notes

Sources

Environmental protection areas of Brazil
Protected areas of Rio de Janeiro (state)
1990 establishments in Brazil